Scleronema may refer to:
 Scleronema (fish), a genus of fishes in the family Trichomycteridae
 Scleronema (plant), a genus of plants in the family Malvaceae